Radiohead Box Set is a box set of albums by the English rock band Radiohead, released on 10 December 2007. It collects their first six studio albums and one live album, recorded while Radiohead were signed to EMI. The albums are included on CDs, a USB stick and as a download. 

Radiohead had no input into the release. Commentators saw it as retaliation from EMI after Radiohead did not renew their contract with them. The box set reached #95 on the Canadian Album Chart.

Contents
Radiohead Box Set set contains Radiohead's first six studio albums and one live album, recorded while Radiohead were signed to EMI:
Pablo Honey (1993)
The Bends (1995)
OK Computer (1997)
Kid A (2000)
Amnesiac (2001)
I Might Be Wrong: Live Recordings (2001)
Hail to the Thief (2003)
The box set was released in physical form as a limited edition seven CD box set, with each album in original digipak sleeves, as a download as DRM-free 320 kbit/s MP3 files with digital artwork and as a 4GB USB Stick. The USB stick contains all seven albums as WAV files and artwork for each album.

Release

Radiohead's record contract with EMI ended in 2003 with the release of their sixth album, Hail to the Thief. EMI hoped to negotiate a new contract for their seventh album, In Rainbows (2007), but Radiohead instead self-released it on their website and signed to XL Recordings for the retail release.

EMI announced the Radiohead box set days after Radiohead signed to XL, and released it in the same week as the special edition of In Rainbows. Radiohead had no input into the release and were reportedly "incensed". Commentators including the Guardian saw the box set as retaliation for the band choosing not to sign a new contract with EMI. According to a report on the blog site Boing Boing, EMI had threatened to release the box set on the same date as the special edition of In Rainbows if Radiohead did not license the physical release to them. A spokesperson for EMI denied the allegation, and said that "Radiohead were kept fully updated of our plans". The EMI owner, Guy Hands, defended the releases as necessary to boost EMI's revenues, and said that "we don't have a huge amount of reasons to be nice [to Radiohead]".

The box set was promoted on Google Ads with an advert reading: "Radiohead – New album In Rainbows now available as boxset". The advert led to an EMI site selling the box set, which does not include In Rainbows. EMI removed the advert, saying it was a "data source glitch". A spokesperson for Radiohead said they accepted the advert was a genuine error.

References 

Albums produced by John Leckie
Albums produced by Sean Slade
Albums produced by Paul Q. Kolderie
Albums produced by Nigel Godrich
2007 compilation albums
Parlophone compilation albums
Parlophone live albums
Radiohead compilation albums
Radiohead live albums